The Beauty from Nivernais is a 1924 French silent drama film directed by Jean Epstein.

Cast 
 Blanche Montel – Clara Louveau
 Marie Lacroix – Mme. Louveau 
 Maurice Touzé – Victor Maugendré
 Pierre Hot – M. Louveau
 Max Bonnet – L'equipage 
 Jean-David Évremond – Maugendré

References

External links 

1924 drama films
1924 films
French silent feature films
French drama films
French black-and-white films
Films directed by Jean Epstein
Silent drama films
1920s French films